Death of an Author may refer to:
 Death of an Author (Lorac novel)
 Death of an Author (Rhode novel)